Penryn College is a mixed secondary academy school and Sports College in the Cornish town of Penryn, England, United Kingdom. It has 1,033 pupils in the age range of 11 to 16 years. The head teacher is Tamsin Schouten

History
Penryn College was established in 1957 in Falmouth and it moved to its present location in 1961. It attained Sports College status in 1998, the seventeenth school to do so. A new £26 million building which was completed in September 2008, has replaced the original block.

On 1 July 2011, Penryn College formally gained academy status. The latest Ofsted inspection (June 2022) saw the school retain its status as 'good', following it's 2 previous inspections in April 2012 and February 2017.

Notable alumni
 Luke Jephott (Footballer)

References

External links
School site
BBC: Education League Tables: Penryn College

Educational institutions established in 1957
Academies in Cornwall
Secondary schools in Cornwall
1957 establishments in England
Penryn, Cornwall